Yeshiva Gedola and Mesivta of Carteret (Hebrew: ישיבה תפארת יהודה אריה) informally, "YGOC", also called Yeshiva Tiferes Yehuda Aryeh, is a yeshiva and non-profit organization located in Carteret in Middlesex County, New Jersey, United States.

History

The yeshiva was founded in 2006 by Rabbi Azriel Brown and Rabbi Yaakov Mayer, both 
graduates of the Mir yeshiva in Jerusalem, and Yeshivas Ner Yisroel of Baltimore, talmidim of Rabbi Shmuel Yaakov Weinberg the son-in-law of Rabbi Yaakov Yitzchok Ruderman, and Rabbi Yaakov Moshe Kulefsky, a very close Student of Reb Shlomo Heiman.

With the backing of Rabbi Aharon Feldman, Rabbi Shmuel Kamenetzky, and Rabbi Yaakov Perlow, among numerous others, Rabbis Brown and Mayer decided to open a yeshiva in the suburban north Jersey town of Carteret. Carteret had previously boasted a Jewish community with two synagogues in the 1950s but its Jewish presence had dwindled since then, to the point that it was no longer able to support the remaining synagogue, a Jewish community center, which closed in 2002. Garson Gruhin and Lou Raiman, remaining board members of the Jewish community center, worked hard to preserve Jewish life in Carteret. Garson Gruhin along with his son Mark I. Gruhin, Esq., arranged to transfer the former synagogue and community center building and an adjoining five-bedroom rabbi's residence to the yeshiva.

The yeshiva opened in September 2006, starting with a small group of 14 students. Initially, Donya Brown and Chani Mayer, wives of the founders, handled the food preparation and bookkeeping for the fledgling institution, and each family hosted all the students in their home for one Shabbos meal. As enrollment grew and the students began staying in the Yeshiva full-time, the Browns and Mayers took an active role in each student's education, and personal growth, helped them with shidduchim (marriage proposals), and even hosted their sheva brachos (festive meals held during the week after the wedding).

In 2015, Rabbi Yaakov T. Biderman became the executive director of the yeshiva. Biderman is an alumnus of the Yeshiva, who was intimately involved in its operations as a student and remained involved throughout the years in between. He also founded the Alumni Association in August 2013, with the help of Zecharya Michelsohn.

In 2017, a Mesivta was added.

Rabbi Avraham Yeshaya Roth is The Rosh Mesivta.

In 2021, the Roshei Yeshiva started their new Yeshiva Gedola, with a First-Year Beis-Medrash from the graduating Twelfth Grade class. Rabbi Brown is giving Shiur to the First-Year Beis-Medrash First-Seder & Rabbi Mayer is giving the Bais-Medrash Shiurim Second-Seder. 
The Yeshiva currently has close to 40 students.

In 2021, the Yeshiva suffered massive amounts of damage from Hurricane Ida. It did not receive assistance from FEMA.

Program

The yeshiva is an all-male Lithuanian (Litvish)-style Talmudic college. Currently, it consists of a mesivta (high school) program.

Curriculum
The Mesivta's studies are broken into two halves. The first half of the day is focused on Talmudic texts and rabbinic literature, mussar (Jewish ethical literature) and practical halacha (Jewish law). The second half of the day is focused on general studies, including math, history, science, language arts, computers, business economics, public speaking and more.

Faculty

Rabbi Yaakov B. Mayer, Rosh Yeshiva
Rabbi Azriel Brown, Rosh Yeshiva
Rabbi Heshy (Yisroel Tzvi) Fireworker, Mashgiach and Twelfth Grade Maggid Shiur
Rabbi Yaakov Cyperstein, Rebbe
Rabbi Avraham Yeshaya Roth, Rosh Mesivta and Eleventh Grade Maggid Shiur
Rabbi Yisroel Daskal, Tenth Grade Maggid Shiur
Rabbi Chaim Motechin, Ninth Grade Maggid Shiur

Rabbi Avrohom Ribiat, Rebbe
Rabbi Moshe Marvet, Rebbe
Rabbi Simcha Hollander, Rebbe

Rabbi Yaakov T. Biderman, Executive Director
Rabbi Teitz, General Studies Principal

Rabbinical Advisory Board 
Harav Shmuel Kamenetsky 
Harav Reuven Feinstein
Harav Aharon Feldman
Harav Eliyahu (Elya) Brudny

Hachnasas Sifrei Torah

In December 2008, the yeshiva celebrated a Hachnasas Sefer Torah, the traditional festivity upon the completion of a new Torah scroll. Several hundred guests came to Carteret for the procession, including several eminent Torah figures. Noe Street was barricaded off to outside traffic as the crowd wound its way to the yeshiva building accompanied by live music and dancing.

In September 2011, the yeshiva held a kesivas osios (Torah scroll-writing ceremony) in Lakewood for another new Torah scroll, that was to be dedicated after Sukkos 2011. The Hachnosas Sefer Torah took place in Carteret.

Hurricane Sandy 
In October 2012 the yeshiva building experienced substantial damage from Hurricane Sandy. One dormitory, hit by the flood and by an explosion from a neighboring building, was condemned by the township. Total damage was estimated at close to $200,000.

References

External links
 
 Alumni association page and form

Carteret, New Jersey
Haredi Judaism in New Jersey
Lithuanian-Jewish culture in the United States
Seminaries and theological colleges in New Jersey
Men's universities and colleges in the United States
Orthodox yeshivas in New Jersey
Educational institutions established in 2006
Kollelim
Universities and colleges in Middlesex County, New Jersey
2006 establishments in New Jersey